L'Archeveque is a small community in the Canadian province of Nova Scotia, located in Richmond County.

References
Cape Breton map

Communities in Richmond County, Nova Scotia
General Service Areas in Nova Scotia